Parakysis longirostris is a species of catfish of the family Akysidae. It goes under common names longnose little warty catfish and Singapore little warty catfish. It is found in the south end of the Malay Peninsula (Malaysia, Singapore) and Bintan Island, Indonesia. A detailed discussion of this species's relationship with the other member of its genus can be found at Parakysis.

References

Akysidae
Freshwater fish of Indonesia
Freshwater fish of Malaysia
Fish of Singapore
Fish described in 1995